Peirce Secondary School (PSS) is a co-educational government secondary school located in Bishan, Singapore. Founded in 1994, Peirce Secondary School is known for its niche in the uniformed groups CCAs.

History 
Peirce Secondary School started functioning in 1994 on the premises of Bishan Park Secondary School. Chia Choon Kiat was its first principal. It began with an intake of 356 Secondary 1 pupils. On 17 February 1995, the school moved to its current premises at 10 Sin Ming Walk.

From 2007 to 2008, the school embarked on an upgrading exercise (PRIME Phase 8) of its premises to include an Indoor Sports Hall and other facilities. The school temporary relocated to 2 Ang Mo Kio Street 23 during the upgrading. The project was completed on schedule and the school returned to its home campus in December 2008.

Today, the school have a total of 23 classes distributed among 5 levels - 13 Express and 10 Normal (Academic) classes.

20th Anniversary 
Peirce Secondary celebrated its 20th anniversary in 2014, with the anniversary assembly as the flagship event. Themed "Peirce, Our Home", the event saw students, parents and teachers contributing more than 1,400 photos on Instagram with the hashtag #Peirce20anniversaryStudents and #Peirce20anniversaryParents. Photos shared by users were printed out to form a heart shape logo located at the 4th level of the school building.

A commemorative musical production was also staged on 1 August 2014. Entitled "Dreams do come True", the musical is a showcase of students’ talents through an entertaining and inspiring story of how one can fulfil his or her dreams through a spirit of adventure.

Absorption of Bishan Park Secondary School 
The Ministry of Education announced on 4 March 2016 that Peirce Secondary School would be merging with Bishan Park Secondary School with effect from January 2018. About 300 students from Bishan Park Secondary School were affected by the merger. The merged school would be located at the current premises of Peirce Secondary School. The merged school will have 2 Distinctive Programmes for Secondary 1 Intake from 2018 onwards, namely "Developing Community Leaders with the Heart to Serve Through Uniformed Groups", as well as "Broadcast Journalism".

Academic information 
Being a government secondary school, Peirce Secondary School offers two academic streams, namely the four-year Express course, as well as the Normal Academic Course

GCE O Level Express Course 
The Express Course is a nationwide four-year programme that leads up to the Singapore-Cambridge GCE Ordinary Level examination.

Academic subjects 
The examinable academic subjects for Singapore-Cambridge GCE Ordinary Level offered by Peirce Secondary School for upper secondary level (via. streaming in secondary 2 level), as of 2017, are listed below.

Notes:
 Subjects indicated with ' * ' are mandatory subjects.
 All students in Singapore are required to undertake a Mother Tongue Language as an examinable subject, as indicated by ' ^ '.
 "SPA" in Pure Science subjects refers to the incorporation of School-based Science Practical Assessment, which 20% of the subject result in the national examination are determined by school-based practical examinations, supervised by the Singapore Examinations and Assessment Board. The SPA Assessment has been replaced by one Practical Assessment in the 2018 O Levels.

Normal Course 

Normal (Academic) Course 
In the Normal (Academic) course, students offer 5-8 subjects in the Singapore-Cambridge GCE Normal Level examination. Compulsory subjects include:
 English Language
 Mother Tongue Language
 Mathematics
 Combined Humanities
A 5th year leading to the Singapore-Cambridge GCE Ordinary Level examination is available to  students who perform well in their Singapore-Cambridge GCE Normal Level examination. Students can move from one course to another based on their performance and the assessment of the school principal and teachers.

Normal (Technical) Course 
The Normal (Technical) course prepares students for a technical-vocational education at the Institute of Technical Education. Students will offer 5-7 subjects in the Singapore-Cambridge GCE Normal Level examination. The curriculum is tailored towards strengthening students’ proficiency in English and Mathematics. Students take English Language, Mathematics, Basic Mother Tongue and Computer Applications as compulsory subjects.

Peirce Secondary School do not have any Normal (Technical) Intake as of 2018.

Co-curricular activities 
Peirce Secondary School has a total of 16 co-curricular activities (CCAs) for students to choose from, ranging from Club and Societies, Performing Arts, Sports and Uniformed Groups.

As a niche of Peirce Secondary School, the uniform groups have attained outstanding achievements. Our UGs like the National Cadet Corps (Land), have been achieving Best Unit Award (Gold) for many consecutive years and received Best Unit Award (Distinction) since 2019 to present and we hope to continue this outstanding performance by our NCC unit. Our NCC unit have also excelled in the Precision Drill Squad (PDS) competition with more than 7 Finalist positions and even Central district Champions in 2010. Other Uniformed Groups we have like the National Police Cadet Corps, the Saint John's Ambulance Brigade have also achieved numerous awards that made our school proud.

Other achievements from the sports and athletics include 'B' Division Rugby Boys, which came in as champions in the National Schools U-17 Rugby Championship 2015.

From the performing art CCA, Peirce Show Choir make the school proud by receiving 3 awards from B’dazzled 2018 and 2019. During B’dazzled 2018, they were dressed as beggars to create the theme “Rag to riches” and during 2019, they were dressed in full white to create the theme “technology”.

A full listing of the Co-curricular Activities offered by Peirce Secondary School is featured below:

Student Leaders Executive Council
The Student Leaders Executive Council (SLEC) was established in 2013.

References

1994 establishments in Singapore
2018 disestablishments in Singapore
Schools in Bishan, Singapore
Secondary schools in Singapore